The Great Satan (Shaytân-e Bozorg) is a demonizing epithet for the United States of America in Iranian foreign policy statements. Occasionally, these words have also been used toward the government of the United Kingdom.

The term was used by Iranian leader Ayatollah Ruhollah Khomeini in his speech on November 5, 1979 to describe the United States, which he accused of imperialism and the sponsoring of corruption throughout the world. The speech occurred one day after the onset of the Iran hostage crisis.

Ayatollah Khomeini also occasionally used the term "Iblis" (the primary devil in Islam) to refer to the United States and other Western countries.

Background 
The government of the Islamic Republic of Iran has a long history of espousing anti-Western sentiment as a result of interference in Iranian affairs by the British and U.S. governments. In 1907, an agreement signed between the British and Russian empires divided Iran into spheres of influence, infuriating Iranian public opinion. 46 years later in 1953, in response to the decision by Iranian Prime Minister Mohammad Mossadeq to nationalize the petroleum industry in Iran, the CIA and MI6 organized a coup d'état to overthrow his administration in favor of a pro-Western leader, Shah Mohammed Reza Pahlavi. The Eisenhower administration was concerned that Mossadeq's nationalist aspirations could lead to an eventual communist takeover of Iran. After widespread rioting and with help from the CIA and MI6, Mossadeq was defeated and the Shah returned to power, ensuring support for Western oil interests in Iran and ending the perceived threat of communist expansion. General Fazlollah Zahedi, who led the military coup, became prime minister. The operation was code-named Operation Ajax. At first, the military coup seemed to fail, and Shah Mohammed Reza Pahlavi fled the country.

In 1965, Ayatollah Khomeini was exiled for criticizing the White Revolution's decision to extend the franchise to women, initiate land reforms and the Shah's unpopular Status of Forces Bill, which gave U.S. military personnel diplomatic immunity for crimes committed in Iran. By the early 1970s, many Iranians opposed the Shah's government. Khomeini eventually returned to Iran and led the 1979 Iranian revolution. During the Iranian Revolution, demonstrators commonly chanted slogans such as "Death to Shah," "Independence, Freedom, Islamic Republic," and "Death to America".

Definition 

Khomeini is quoted as saying on November 5, 1979, "[America is] the great Satan, the wounded snake." The term was used extensively during and after the Islamic Revolution, and it continues to be used in some Iranian political circles. Use of the term at rallies is often accompanied by shouts of "Marg bar Amrika!" ("Death to America"). It is used in academic journals.

Lesser Satan 
Khomeini called the Soviet Union, the principal antagonist of the US during the Cold War, the "Lesser Satan" because of its atheistic communist ideology, and he said that Iran should support neither side of the Cold War.

The State of Israel was condemned as the "Little Satan" in 1979 by Khomeini when he was addressing Israel's backing of the Shah, its close ties to the US, and the ongoing Israeli–Palestinian conflict. Former Libyan leader Muammar Gaddafi also stated that "Israel is the little Satan" in a July 1980 interview.

See also 
 Iran–United States relations
 Devil (Islam)
 Anti-American sentiment
 Anti-Israeli sentiment
 Little Satan
 Zionist entity
 Anti-British sentiment
 old fox

References and notes

External links 

 
 
 The Great Satan by Kavitha Rao, April 26, 2000
 'Great Satan' warned of a burning hell by Ian Black, The Guardian, February 16, 2005
 How the "Great Satan" Became Just Great

Anti-Americanism
Anti-imperialism
Anti-Western sentiment
Iran–United States relations
Political slurs
Political catchphrases
Political terminology of Iran
Political quotes
Ruhollah Khomeini
Propaganda in Iran